Bar Medeghe (also: Bar Madeghe) is a populated place in the central Hiran province of Somalia. It is situated in the Beledweyne District. The settlement lies 21 km southwest of Beledweyne, the provincial capital.

Notes

References
Bar Medeghe on "Geographic.org"
Bar Medeghe on "Geonames.org"

External links
'Zoomable' satellite images of Bar Medeghe: here and here.
Administrative map of Beledweyne District with the location of Bar Madeghe

Populated places in Hiran, Somalia